Chii may refer to:
 Chii Tomiya (born 1991), Japanese professional wrestler
 Takeo Chii (born 1942–2012), Japanese actor
 Chi (Chobits), a fictional character in the manga series Chobits

See also

 Chi (disambiguation)
Chiki